Villapinzón is a municipality and town of Colombia in the Almeidas Province, part of the department of Cundinamarca. Villapinzón borders Ventaquemada (Boyacá) and Lenguazaque in the north, Chocontá, Tibiritá and La Capilla in the south, Chocontá and Lenguazaque in the west and Ventaquemada, Turmequé and Úmbita in the east.

Etymology 
Villapinzón was named Hato Viejo for most of its history. In 1903, the name was changed to "Pinzón", honouring Próspero Pinzón Romero, commander of the army and Minister of War of Colombia under Colombian president José Manuel Marroquín. Próspero Pinzón Romero was born in Hato Viejo. A year later, it became Villapinzón.

History 
The history of Villapinzón is relatively young; historian Ramón Correa studied the pre-Columbian history of the area and did not find evidence Villapinzón was populated before the Spanish conquest of the Muisca. Villapinzón was founded on October 14, 1776 by Francisco de Vargas Figueroa.

Economy 
Economically, Villapinzón is characterized by a large tannery (curtido) industry. Additionally, agriculture and livestock farming are important.

Born in Villapinzón 
 Próspero Pinzón, namesake of the municipality and Minister of War
 Rodrigo Contreras, professional cyclist
 Efraím Rico, former professional cyclist

Gallery

References 

Municipalities of Cundinamarca Department
Populated places established in 1776
1776 establishments in the Spanish Empire